White Water is a census-designated place (CDP) in Delaware County, Oklahoma, United States. The population was 80 at the 2010 census.

Geography
White Water is located in northeastern Delaware County, to the north of Whitewater Creek, a northwest-flowing tributary of the Neosho River.

Demographics

References

Census-designated places in Oklahoma
Census-designated places in Delaware County, Oklahoma